Singur is a census town in Singur CD Block in Chandannagore subdivision of Hooghly district in the Indian state of West Bengal.

Geography

Location
It has an average elevation of 14 metres (45 ft), and is situated on the Ganges delta.

The several villages comprising Singur include Dewan Bheri, Dobandi, Baburberi, Khasherbheri, Joymolla, Ujjal Sangha, Beraberi, Bajemelia, Anandanagar, Deb Design Gallery, Ratanpur, Gopalnagar, Apurbapur, Jalaghata, Daluigacha East and West, Mirzapur, Bankipur, Boinchipota, Nabapally, Beleghata, Khosalpur, Pawnan, Gandarpukur, Dasani & Choyani, Ratanpur 1 & 2, Singherbheri, Nasibpur, Mollasimla, Rasulpur, Durgarampur, Dansi, Diara, Gobindapur, Hakimpur, Nanda, Habaspota, Naskarpur, Balarampur, Chhutipur, Subhipur, Notun Bazar, Benipur, Antisara, Burashanti, Ghanashyampur, Paltagorh, Telipukur, Khaserchak, Batriskhura, Alurbadh, Durgarampur, Biramnagar, Harishnagar etc.

Police station
Singur police station has jurisdiction over Singur CD Block.

CD Block HQ
The headquarters of Singur CD Block are located at Singur.

Urbanisation
In Chandannagore subdivision 58.52% of the population is rural and the urban population is 41.48%. Chandannagore subdivision has 1 municipal corporation, 3 municipalities and 7 census towns. The single municipal corporation is Chandernagore Municipal Corporation. The municipalities are Tarakeswar Municipality, Bhadreswar Municipality and Champdany Municipality. Of the three CD Blocks in Chandannagore subdivision, Tarakeswar CD Block is wholly rural, Haripal CD Block is predominantly rural with just 1 census town, and Singur CD Block is slightly less rural with 6 census towns. Polba Dadpur and Dhaniakhali CD Blocks of Chinsurah subdivision (included in the map alongside) are wholly rural. The municipal areas are industrialised. All places marked in the map are linked in the larger full screen map.

Demographics
As per 2011 Census of India, Singur had a total population of 21,382 of which 10,825 (51%) were males and 10,557 (49%) were females. Population below 6 years was 1,646. The total number of literates in Singur was 17,458 (88.46% of the population over 6 years).

As of 2001 India census, Singur had a population of 19,539. Males constitute 51% of the population and females 49%. Singur has an average literacy rate of 76%, higher than the national average of 59.5%: male literacy is 81%, and female literacy is 71%. In Singur, 9% of the population is under 6 years of age.

Purusottampur is the one of the oldest villages in Singur. Adi Biswalakhi Mandir, Dakat Kali Mandir, Anandamoyee Kali Mandir, Santosimar Mandir and Shib Mandir are situated in this village.

Economy

Tata Motors at Singur

Singur gained international media attention since Tata Motors started constructing a factory to manufacture their $2,500 car, the Tata Nano at Singur. The small car was scheduled to roll out of the factory by 2008. In October 2008 Tatas announced withdrawal from the project. In 2016, the Supreme Court quashed the West Bengal government's acquisition of 997 acres of agricultural land for Tata Motors and ordered its return to 9,117 landowners.

Commuters
Around a total of 32 lakh people from all around the city commute to Kolkata daily for work. In the Howrah-Tarakeswar section there are 48 trains that carry commuters from 21 railway stations.

Transport

Rail
SIU/Singur is well connected with Howrah Junction railway station. Local trains runs between Singur railway station and Howrah Station via Sheoraphuli railway station.

Roads
Singur is well connected with Kolkata through Durgapur Expressway (NH 2), Baidyabati to Tarkeswar connected road as (SH 2).

Education
Singur Government College, a general degree college, was established at Singur in 2013. It is affiliated with the University of Burdwan and offers honours courses in Bengali, English, Sanskrit, Santhali, history, philosophy, political science, sociology and psychology.

There are several schools in Singur: Madhubati Surabala Vidyamandir, Jogamaya Memorial Institute, Mahamaya High School, Golap Mohini Mallick Girls' High School, Anandanagar A C Roy High School, Gopalnagar High School, Beraberi SNM High School, Star Land School, Explorer School, Educare School, Paltagarh High School, Swami Vivekananda School, and Abani Sishu Niketan.

References

External links
 Singur archives at Sanhati

 DEB DESIGN GALLERY

Cities and towns in Hooghly district